Doulatabad or Daulatabad is a Mandal in Mahbubnagar district, Telangana.

Geography
It has an average elevation of 543 metres (1784 ft).

References

Mandals in Mahbubnagar district